This is a list of electoral results for the electoral district of Swan Hills in Western Australian state elections.

Members for Swan Hills

Election results

Elections in the 2020s

Elections in the 2010s

Elections in the 2000s

Elections in the 1990s

Elections in the 1980s

References

Western Australian state electoral results by district